İnköy can refer to:

 İnköy, Gerede
 İnköy, Ilgaz
 İnköy, Tarsus